Lomatium macrocarpum is a perennial flowering plant in the carrot family known by the common names bigseed lomatium, biscuit root or bigseed biscuitroot. It is native to much of western North America, where it can be found in various types of habitat, including the grasslands of the Great Plains, and particularly in rocky areas. It is a spreading or erect perennial herb growing up to about half a meter long with hairy, gray-green herbage. The inflorescence bears an umbel of yellowish, greenish, purplish, or white flowers, growing from a lateral stem. The fruit is a compressed, winged, round or oval disc up to about 2 cm long.

The roots are tuberous and have been made into a flour.

References

External links
 Calflora Database: Lomatium macrocarpum (Bigseed biscuitroot,  Large fruited lomatium)
Jepson Manual eFlora treatment of Lomatium macrocarpum
USDA Plants Profile for Lomatium macrocarpum (bigseed biscuitroot)
UC Cal Photos gallery of Lomatium macrocarpum

macrocarpum
Flora of Western Canada
Flora of the Northwestern United States
Flora of the North-Central United States
Flora of California
Flora of Nevada
Flora of Utah
Flora of the Great Basin
Flora of the Great Plains (North America)
Flora of the Rocky Mountains
Flora of the Klamath Mountains
Taxa named by Asa Gray
Taxa named by John Merle Coulter
Taxa named by John Torrey
Flora without expected TNC conservation status